PF-3845 is a selective inhibitor of fatty acid amide hydrolase.  It results in increased levels of anandamide and results in cannabinoid receptor-based effects.  It has anti-inflammatory action in mice colitis models.  Antidiarrheal and antinociceptive effects were also seen in mouse models of pain.

A 2017 study published in the Journal of Psychiatry and Neuroscience found that PF-3845 exerts rapid and long-lasting anti-anxiety effects in mice exposed acutely to stress or chronically to the stress hormone corticosterone.

References 

Cannabinoids
Experimental drugs
Trifluoromethyl compounds